The 1992 Critérium du Dauphiné Libéré was the 44th edition of the cycle race and was held from 1 June to 8 June 1992. The race started in Charbonnières-les-Bains and finished in Villard-de-Lans. The race was won by Charly Mottet of the RMO team.

Teams
Fourteen teams, containing a total of 111 riders, participated in the race:

Route

General classification

References

Further reading

1992
1992 in French sport
June 1992 sports events in Europe